is an unfinished Japanese anime OVA series based on the video game of the same name which itself a spin-off from the Samurai Shodown series, released for DVD on May 25, 2002. The OVA is directed by Katsuma Kanazawa with character designs from Yasuomi Umetsu, best known for doing the designs in Mezzo Forte and Kite. It was first slated for 13 episodes, cut to two, but lacked funding to finish the second. As a result, it only has a single episode released. Like the game, it hasn't been licensed anywhere outside Japan.

Story
The events of the story are meant to take place during the time of peace between the first and second games of the series. The story begins with Nakoruru on a bloody battlefield in the midst of a snow blizzard. She has suffered a deep wound on her back and collapses, hallucinating slightly due to the cold and blood loss. The audience is treated to a brief flashback of Rera and Nakoruru at the battlefield. It's insinuated that she received her wound from a child armed with a sword. Rera raises her arm to finish him and, through a reflection in the child's eye, we see Nakoruru mirroring the same action. She is found by her childhood friends, Yantamu and Manari, and is brought back to Kamui Kotan.

The scene cuts to the following day to a sunny morning. Three old women retell a myth from their village: it mirrors the same origin story of Mizuki where she will someday "eat the world whole". The story scares the children listening but they cheer up once they see Yantamu. Since he had a message from the village chief for Nakoruru, he decides to take the group of concerned children with him. Manari and Rimururu were tending to her wound when she screams from the pain. Yantamu runs in concerned only to be frozen by an angry Rimururu.

Later that night, Nakoruru has a night terror about Rera's words in the beginning: to kill the child to save herself. Since Nakoruru is unwilling to talk about what happened when she went down the mountain, her friends and Rimururu are beginning to worry about her. Yantamu, the chief's son, wants her to rest, even though the village elders want her to resume her duties as soon as possible.

While this is happening, an evil presence lurks closer to Kamui Kotan. It affects the animals and one of the children in the village, causing them to momentarily snap with violent behavior. Rera, frustrated that Nakoruru will not fight, oversees these events. At this time, she is separated from her "host", Nakoruru. She takes Nakoruru's weapon from her hut, which hasn't been touched since she came back.

Meanwhile, Manari and Nakoruru spend time in one of their old playing spots. While they were reminiscing, she asks Manari to sing a song to her, something that she used to do a lot as a child. Afterwards, it starts to rain and they decide to head back. At this time, a rampaging bear charges from the forest towards the girls. Manari faints from fear and Nakoruru pleads with the bear to stop. The bear, too insane to hear her, readies its strike. Though she braces herself for the blow, Rera kills the assailant and saves her. She once again demands to know why Nakoruru won't fight when Yantamu and Rimururu run to the scene (Rera disappears before they get close). They were about to report that her weapon, Chichiushi, was missing until they see it in the bear's back. Yantamu tells Nakoruru to rely on him more, not wanting her to draw her blade again.

Sometime afterward, they all go swimming in a lake. Nakoruru, separated in her own bathing area, experiences a premonition of devastation and death of a nearby village. During this time, Rera appears before her again, saying that this was her fault since Nakoruru would not fight. The voices of the deceased begin to whimper to her only stopping when her friends tell her the same news she foresaw. The lone survivor of the nearby village had reported the tragedy to the village elder and found shelter at his place.

Nakoruru, alone over a ravine and desiring to live in peace, readies to throw Chichiushi away until she remembers her mother -who had tried to do the same. Her mother, who hears her daughter refer to the head priest as "Father", tells her to not refer to him in that way. Nakoruru -a child in this memory- asks why she can't. Briefly remembering her real love who had died earlier, she explains to Nakoruru that priestesses cannot marry. The memory moves the present Nakoruru to remember her duty as a priestess: one who fights for others not for herself. The climax of the episode has Nakoruru protecting a deer from a rock slide, implied to be caused by evil entities. It is unknown what happens next as the screen fades black.

Voice cast
Nakoruru: Harumi Ikoma
Rimururu: Keiko Kamitani
Manari: Ayako Kawasumi
Yantamu: Takehito Koyasu
Rera, Nakoruru's mother: Kyōko Hikami

References

External links
 
 

2002 anime OVAs
Arms Corporation
OVAs based on video games
SNK Playmore
Works based on SNK video games